The Sioux Area Metro (SAM) is the local governmental transit agency in Sioux Falls, South Dakota, and the largest operator of public transportation in the state. They provide multiple scheduled fixed routes and paratransit services. Although the bus fleet is owned by the city the system is currently managed by First Transit and operated under Sioux Area Metro.

Facilities

Transit Offices and Garage
Address: 500 E. Sixth St.
Coordinates: 
Facilities: Head office, bus storage and maintenance

Sioux Area Metro Depot

Address: 120 E. 11th St.
Coordinates: 
Facilities: Downtown bus terminal
The Sioux Area Metro Depot was originally built in 1988 and known as "The Bus Stop". In 2017, the facility underwent a $2 million renovation and reopened on November 6, 2017 with the name Sioux Area Metro Depot. The renovations included a skylight, new canopy, new benches, bike storage and bike repair station. The facility serves 11 routes.

Southwest Transfer Facility
Address: 4409 S. Louise Ave.
Coordinates: 
Facilities: Mall area bus terminal

Fixed routes
Effective February 1, 2016

Routes operate Monday-Saturday unless otherwise indicated.

Discontinued Services
Sioux Area Metro operated an old-time trolley styled bus in the downtown area. In 2014 operation of the service was assumed by Downtown Sioux Falls Inc, and in 2019 they were joined by a coalition of local businesses to continue funding through 2022.

Sioux Area Metro also operated four school "tripper" routes until May 2016. These routes were open to the public, with high schools as destinations. School Bus, Inc is currently operating those routes.

Paratransit
Sioux Falls Paratransit is an extension to the city's fixed-route system, and persons with disabilities are encouraged to use it. Each paratransit bus is equipped with a wheelchair lift. All passengers must be certified by guidelines established by the Americans with Disabilities Act, and be registered with Sioux Area Metro after qualifying. Passengers must schedule Paratransit trips by calling their local office.

Fixed route ridership and service

The ridership and service statistics shown here are of fixed route services only and do not include demand response. Per capita statistics are based on the Sioux Falls urbanized area as reported in NTD data. The significant changes in per capita numbers from 2010 to 2011 are a result of the 2010 census numbers replacing the 2000 census numbers.

Fleet
2009 2015 2018 Gillig Low Floor

See also
 List of bus transit systems in the United States
 Rapid City Rapid Ride
 YST Transit

References

Bus transportation in South Dakota
Transportation in Sioux Falls, South Dakota